Terry Dyson (born 29 November 1934) is a retired footballer who played as a winger.

Career
Dyson was spotted playing football for the British Army during National Service After being demobbed in 1955 he joined Tottenham Hotspur from non-league Scarborough. Dyson played his first match for Tottenham against Sheffield United in March 1955. He played for the North London club until 1965. He was a regular member of the Double-winning side of 1960–61, scoring in the FA Cup Final against Leicester. Dyson was also a member of the team that won the 1962–63 European Cup Winners' Cup, scoring twice in the final against Atlético Madrid. He made a total of 209 appearances and scored 55 goals for Tottenham.

He later played for Fulham, Colchester United, Wealdstone and Guildford City. Dyson is the only Spurs player to score a hat-trick in the North London derby, doing so on 26 August 1961 in a 4–3 win for Spurs.

Honours 
With Tottenham Hotspur:
 1960–61 Football League First Division  Winner
 1960–61 FA Cup Winner
 1962–63 European Cup Winners' Cup Winner

Today
Dyson currently works part-time for the Football Association, assessing schoolboy matches, and lives in Middlesex. Dyson is the uncle of English golfer Simon Dyson.

References

External links
 The Double
 Malton school interview
 Hall of Fame
 
 Pocket Attila

1934 births
English footballers
Scarborough F.C. players
Tottenham Hotspur F.C. players
Fulham F.C. players
Colchester United F.C. players
Living people
English Football League players
Footballers from North Yorkshire
Association football wingers
Sportspeople from Scarborough, North Yorkshire
20th-century British Army personnel
FA Cup Final players